Ross Sinclair may refer to:

 Ross Sinclair (artist) (born 1966), Scottish visual artist, musician and writer
 Ross Sinclair (water polo) (born 1985), American water polo player and coach